Viktor Preiss (born 13 March 1947 in Prague) is a Czech actor. He popularly known for his roles in Hospital at the End of the City or Give the Devil His Due. He starred  in dozens of Czech films and television programs, including the film Operace Silver A under director Jiří Strach in 2007.

Selected filmography
 Lovers in the Year One (1973)
 Hospital at the End of the City (1978, TV)
 Give the Devil His Due (1985)
 The Territory of White Deer (1991, TV)
 Dark Blue World (2001)
 Operace Silver A (2007)
Duch nad zlato (2013)
Případ pro malíře (2016)
Každý milion dobrý (2016)
Angel of the Lord 2 (2016)

References

External links
 

Czech male film actors
Czech male stage actors
Czech male television actors
1947 births
Living people
Czech male voice actors
Male actors from Prague
Academy of Performing Arts in Prague alumni
20th-century Czech male actors
21st-century Czech male actors
Recipients of the Thalia Award